The fiddler crab or calling crab may be any of more than one hundred species of semiterrestrial marine crabs in the family Ocypodidae, well known for their sexually dimorphic claws; the males' major claw is much larger than the minor claw, while the females' claws are both the same size. A smaller number of ghost crab and mangrove crab species are also found in the family Ocypodidae. This entire group is composed of small crabs, the largest being slightly over two inches (5 cm) across. Fiddler crabs are found along sea beaches and brackish intertidal mud flats, lagoons, swamps, and various other types of brackish or salt-water wetlands.

Like all crabs, fiddler crabs shed their shells as they grow. If they have lost legs or claws during their present growth cycle, a new one will be present when they molt. If the large fiddle claw is lost, males will develop one on the same side after their next molt. Newly molted crabs are very vulnerable because of their soft shells. They are reclusive and hide until the new shell hardens.

In a controlled laboratory setting, fiddler crabs exhibit a constant circadian rhythm that mimics the ebb and flow of the tides: they turn dark during the day and light at night.

Ecology
Found in mangroves, in salt marshes, and on sandy or muddy beaches of West Africa, the Western Atlantic, the Eastern Pacific, Indo-Pacific and Algarve region of Portugal, fiddler crabs are easily recognized by their distinctively asymmetric claws.

Fiddler crabs communicate by a sequence of waves and gestures; males have an oversized claw or chela; used in clashes of ritualised combat of courtship over a female and signal their intentions between conspecifics. The movement of the smaller claw from ground to mouth during feeding explains the crabs' common name; it looks as if the animal were playing the larger claw like a fiddle.

The crab's smaller claw picks up a chunk of sediment from the ground and brings it to the mouth, where its contents are sifted through (making the crab a detritivore). After anything edible is salvaged, be it algae, microbes, fungus, or other decaying detritus, the sediment is replaced in the form of a little ball. The presence of these sediment balls near the entrance to a burrow is a good indication of its occupation. Some experts believe that the feeding habits of fiddler crabs play a vital role in the preservation of wetland environments; by sifting through the sands, they aerate the substrate and prevent anaerobic conditions.

Life cycle

Fiddler crabs live rather brief lives of no more than two years (up to three years in captivity). Male fiddler crabs use the major claw to perform a waving display as a form of female courtship. Females choose their mate based on claw size and also quality of the waving display. In many fiddler crab species, the female occupies the burrow of their mate while she lays her clutch of eggs. Research shows that the male major claw size is also correlated with burrow width; the width of the burrow influences incubation temperature. Therefore, the female will choose a male mate whose claw size indicates the best burrow environment for her clutch of eggs. The waving display is also thought to indicate to females the overall healthiness of the male; a more vigorous display is more difficult to do and thus requires the male to be in prime health condition, which suggests that the male will help produce viable offspring.

Male versus male competition also occurs as fighting with the major claws. If a male loses his larger claw, the smaller one will begin to grow larger and the lost claw will regenerate into a new (small) claw. For at least some species of fiddler crabs, however, the small claw remains small, while the larger claw regenerates over a period of several molts, being about half its former size after the first molt. The female fiddler carries her eggs in a mass on the underside of her body. She remains in her burrow during a two-week gestation period, after which she ventures out to release her eggs into the receding tide. The larvae remain planktonic for a further two weeks.

Fiddler crabs such as Austruca mjoebergi have been shown to bluff about their fighting ability. Upon regrowing a lost claw, a crab will occasionally regrow a weaker claw that nevertheless intimidates crabs with smaller but stronger claws. This is an example of dishonest signalling.

The dual functionality of the major claw of fiddler crabs has presented an evolutionary conundrum in that the claw mechanics best suited for fighting do not match up with the mechanics best suited for a waving display.

Genera and species
More than 100 species of fiddler crabs make up 11 of the 13 genera in the crab family Ocypodidae. These were formerly members of the genus Uca. In 2016, most of the subgenera of Uca were elevated to genus rank, and the fiddler crabs now occupy 11 genera making up the subfamilies Gelasiminae and Ucinae.

 Afruca
 Afruca tangeri (Eydoux, 1835)
 Austruca
 Austruca albimana (Kossmann, 1877) (white-handed fiddler crab)
 Austruca annulipes (H.Milne Edwards, 1837) (ring-legged fiddler crab)
 Austruca bengali (bengal fiddler crab)
 Austruca citrus (citrus fiddler crab)
 Austruca cryptica (Naderloo, Türkay & Chen, 2010) (cryptic fiddler crab)
 Austruca iranica (Pretzmann, 1971) (iranian fiddler crab)
 Austruca lactea (De Haan, 1835) (milky fiddler crab)
 Austruca mjoebergi (Rathbun, 1924) (banana fiddler crab)
 Austruca occidentalis (Naderloo, Schubart & Shih, 2016) (East African fiddler crab)
 Austruca perplexa (H.Milne Edwards, 1852) (perplexing fiddler crab)
 Austruca sindensis (Alcock, 1900) (indus fiddler crab)
 Austruca triangularis (A.Milne-Edwards, 1873) (triangular fiddler crab)
 Austruca variegata (Heller, 1862) (motley fiddler crab)
 Cranuca
 Cranuca inversa  (Hoffmann, 1874)
 Gelasimus
 Gelasimus borealis (Crane, 1975) (northern calling fiddler crab)
 Gelasimus dampieri (Crane, 1975) (dampier's fiddler crab)
 Gelasimus excisa (eastern calling fiddler crab)
 Gelasimus hesperiae (Crane, 1975) (western calling fiddler crab)
 Gelasimus jocelynae (Shih, Naruse & Ng, 2010) (jocelyn's fiddler crab)
 Gelasimus neocultrimanus (Bott, 1973)
 Gelasimus palustris Stimpson, 1862
 Gelasimus pugilator Stimpson, 1862
 Gelasimus rubripes Hombron & Jacquinot, 1846
 Gelasimus subeylindricus Stimpson, 1862
 Gelasimus tetragonon (Herbst, 1790) (tetragonal fiddler crab)
 Gelasimus vocans (Linnaeus, 1758) (calling fiddler crab)
 Gelasimus vomeris (McNeill, 1920) (orange-clawed fiddler crab)
 Leptuca
 Leptuca batuenta (Crane, 1941) (beating fiddler crab)
 Leptuca beebei (Crane, 1941) (Beebe's fiddler crab)
 Leptuca coloradensis (Rathbun, 1893) (painted fiddler crab)
 Leptuca crenulata (Lockington, 1877) (Mexican fiddler crab)
 Leptuca cumulanta (Crane, 1943) (heaping fiddler crab)
 Leptuca deichmanni (Rathbun, 1935) (Deichmann's fiddler crab)
 Leptuca dorotheae (von Hagen, 1968) (Dorothy's fiddler crab)
 Leptuca festae (Nobili, 1902) (Festa's fiddler crab)
 Leptuca helleri (Rathbun, 1902) (Heller's fiddler crab)
 Leptuca inaequalis (Rathbun, 1935) (uneven fiddler crab)
 Leptuca latimanus (Rathbun, 1893) (lateral-handed fiddler crab)
 Leptuca leptodactyla (Rathbun, 1898) (thin-fingered fiddler crab)
 Leptuca limicola (Crane, 1941) (Pacific mud fiddler crab)
 Leptuca musica (Rathbun, 1914) (musical fiddler crab)
 Leptuca oerstedi (Rathbun, 1904) (aqua fiddler crab)
 Leptuca panacea (Novak & Salmon, 1974) (gulf sand fiddler crab)
 Leptuca pugilator (Bosc, 1802) (Atlantic sand fiddler crab)
 Leptuca pygmaea (Crane, 1941) (pygmy fiddler crab)
 Leptuca saltitanta (Crane, 1941) (energetic fiddler crab)
 Leptuca speciosa (Ives, 1891) (brilliant fiddler crab)
 Leptuca spinicarpa (Rathbun, 1900) (spiny-wristed fiddler crab)
 Leptuca stenodactylus (Milne-Edwards & Lucas, 1843) (narrow-fingered fiddler crab)
 Leptuca subcylindrica (Stimpson, 1859) (Laguna Madre fiddler crab)
 Leptuca tallanica (von Hagen, 1968) (Peruvian fiddler crab)
 Leptuca tenuipedis (Crane, 1941) (slender-legged fiddler crab)
 Leptuca terpsichores (Crane, 1941) (dancing fiddler crab)
 Leptuca thayeri M. J. Rathbun, 1900 (Atlantic mangrove fiddler crab)
 Leptuca tomentosa (Crane, 1941) (matted fiddler crab)
 Leptuca umbratila (Crane, 1941) (Pacific mangrove fiddler crab)
 Leptuca uruguayensis (Nobili, 1901) (Uruguayan fiddler crab)
 Minuca
 Minuca argillicola (Crane, 1941) (clay fiddler crab)
 Minuca brevifrons (Stimpson, 1860) (narrow-fronted fiddler crab)
 Minuca burgersi (Holthuis, 1967) (burger's fiddler crab)
 Minuca ecuadoriensis (Maccagno, 1928) (Pacific hairback fiddler crab)
 Minuca galapagensis (galápagos fiddler crab)
 Minuca herradurensis (Bott, 1954) (la herradura fiddler crab)
 Minuca longisignalis (Salmon & Atsaides, 1968) (longwave gulf fiddler)
 Minuca marguerita (Thurman, 1981) (olmec fiddler crab)
 Minuca minax (Le Conte, 1855) (red-jointed fiddler crab)
 Minuca mordax (Smith, 1870) (biting fiddler crab)
 Minuca osa (Landstorfer & Schubart, 2010) (osa fiddler crab)
 Minuca pugnax (S. I. Smith, 1870) (Atlantic marsh fiddler crab)
 Minuca rapax (Smith, 1870) (mudflat fiddler crab)
 Minuca umbratila Crane, 1941 (Pacific mangrove fiddler crab)
 Minuca victoriana (von Hagen, 1987) (victorian fiddler crab)
 Minuca virens (Salmon & Atsaides, 1968) (green-banded fiddler crab)
 Minuca vocator (Herbst, 1804) (Atlantic hairback fiddler crab)
 Minuca zacae (Crane, 1941) (lesser Mexican fiddler crab)
 Paraleptuca
 Paraleptuca boninensis (Shih, Komai & Liu, 2013) (bonin islands fiddler crab)
 Paraleptuca chlorophthalmus (H.Milne Edwards, 1837) (green-eyed fiddler crab)
 Paraleptuca crassipes (White, 1847) (thick-legged fiddler crab)
 Paraleptuca splendida (Stimpson, 1858) (splendid fiddler crab)
 Petruca
 Petruca panamensis Ng, Shih & Christy, 2015
 Tubuca
 Tubuca acuta (Stimpson, 1858) (acute fiddler crab)
 Tubuca alcocki Shih, Chan & Ng, 2018 (alcock's fiddler crab)
 Tubuca arcuata (De Haan, 1835) (bowed fiddler crab)
 Tubuca australiae (Crane, 1975)
 Tubuca bellator (White, 1847) (belligerent fiddler crab)
 Tubuca capricornis (Crane, 1975) (capricorn fiddler crab)
 Tubuca coarctata (H.Milne Edwards, 1852) (compressed fiddler crab)
 Tubuca demani (Ortmann, 1897) (demanding fiddler crab)
 Tubuca dussumieri (H.Milne Edwards, 1852) (dussumier's fiddler crab)
 Tubuca elegans (George & Jones, 1982) (elegant fiddler crab)
 Tubuca flammula (Crane, 1975) (flame-backed fiddler crab)
 Tubuca forcipata (Adams & White, 1849) (forceps fiddler crab)
 Tubuca hirsutimanus (George & Jones, 1982) (hairy-handed fiddler crab)
 Tubuca longidigitum (Kingsley, 1880) (long-fingered fiddler crab)
 Tubuca paradussumieri (Bott, 1973) (spined fiddler crab)
 Tubuca polita (Crane, 1975) (polished fiddler crab)
 Tubuca rhizophorae (Tweedie, 1950) (Asian mangrove fiddler crab)
 Tubuca rosea (Tweedie, 1937) (rose fiddler crab)
 Tubuca seismella (Crane, 1975) (shaking fiddler crab)
 Tubuca signata (Hess, 1865) (signaling fiddler crab)
 Tubuca typhoni (Crane, 1975) (typhoon fiddler crab)
 Tubuca urvillei (H.Milne Edwards, 1852) (d'urville's fiddler crab)
 Uca
 †Uca antiqua Brito, 1972
 Uca heteropleura (Smith, 1870) (American Red fiddler crab)
 †Uca inaciobritoi Martins-Neto, 2001
 Uca insignis (H.Milne Edwards, 1852) (distinguished fiddler crab)
 Uca intermedia von Prahl & Toro, 1985 (intermediate fiddler crab)
 Uca major Herbst, 1782 (greater fiddler crab)
 †Uca marinae Dominguez-Alonso, 2008
 Uca maracoani Latreille 1803 (Brazilian fiddler crab)
 Uca monilifera Rathbun, 1914 (necklaced fiddler crab)
 †Uca nitida Desmarest, 1822
 †Uca oldroydi Rathbun, 1926
 Uca ornata (Smith, 1870) (ornate fiddler crab)
 Uca princeps (Smith, 1870) (large Mexican fiddler crab)
 Uca stylifera (H.Milne Edwards, 1852) (styled fiddler crab)
 Uca subcylindrica Stimpson, 1862 (Laguna Madre fiddler)
 Xeruca
 Xeruca formosensis (Rathbun, 1921)

Gallery

Captivity
Fiddler crabs are occasionally kept as pets. The fiddler crabs sold in pet stores generally come from brackish water lagoons. Because they live in lower salinity water, pet stores may call them fresh-water crabs, but they cannot survive indefinitely in fresh water. Fiddler crabs have been known to attack small fish in captivity, as opposed to their natural feeding habits.

See also
Declawing of crabs

References

External links
 
 Movie of two fiddler crabs (Uca lactea lactea) waving the enlarged claw  - University of Kyoto
 Info on systematics, phylogeny and morphology of fiddlers - Fiddlercrab.info
 The colorful fiddler crabs in the mangrove forest of Borneo - mysabah.com

 

Ocypodoidea
Asymmetry
Arthropod common names